WXMB-LP is a radio station broadcasting a Christian format. Licensed to Myrtle Beach, South Carolina, United States. The station is currently owned by Calvary Chapel of Myrtle Beach, and signed on September 6, 2015.

Airing Bible teaching by prominent and local pastors, WXMB-LP's focus is on broadcasting "Word & Worship", programming focused on Bible teaching and Christian worship music.

References

External links

2015 establishments in South Carolina
XMB-LP
Radio stations established in 2015
XMB-LP